Sumner Francis Dudley Walters (May 20, 1898 - February 11, 1979) was second bishop of the Episcopal Diocese of San Joaquin, serving from 1944 to 1969. He was a graduate of Princeton University in the Class of 1919 and received an M.A. from Columbia University in 1921.

External links 
Princeton Alumni Weekly obituary, July 16, 1979
Retired Bishop Walters Dies

1898 births
1979 deaths
Princeton University alumni
Columbia University alumni
20th-century American Episcopalians
Episcopal bishops of San Joaquin
20th-century American clergy